Johannes Isaaks (23 January 1941 – 19 March 2010) was a Namibian teacher, politician and community activist. He was the first Mayor of Gibeon. He also taught at a number of prominent schools prior to and after independence.

References

1941 births
2010 deaths
Mayors of places in Namibia
People from ǁKaras Region
Namibian educators